Rene Pflugmacher is a German sprint canoer who competed in the mid-1990s. He won a gold medal in the K-4 1000 m event at the 1995 ICF Canoe Sprint World Championships in Duisburg.

References

German male canoeists
Living people
Year of birth missing (living people)
ICF Canoe Sprint World Championships medalists in kayak